Broadsheet was a Telefís Éireann television current affairs programme presented by John O'Donoghue, Brian Cleeve, and Brian Farrell and broadcast in Ireland live on weekday evenings from 1962 to 1963.

Background

Broadsheet was created by Telefís Éireann as the newly established station's flagship current affairs programme.  Broadcast live from Monday to Friday between 6:40pm and 7:15pm, the new programme was in direct competition with BBC Television's Tonight programme.  Broadsheet was broadcast for the first time on 1 January 1962, the first full day of programming by Telefís Éireann.  It was edited by P. P. O'Reilly.

Content and style

The programme was broadcast half-an-hour after the early evening news and provided a more detailed analysis of topical matters and current affairs. There was a mixture of incisive and light-hearted items: unscripted studio interviews and filmed reports. The programme received a Jacob's Award for broadcasting in 1962.

Broadsheet was broadcast for the last time on 4 October 1963.  It was replaced by a new programme called Newsbeat, which effectively was a merger between News and Broadsheet.
 
The three presenters - O'Donoghue, Cleeve and Farrell - went on to play prominent roles in subsequent current affairs programmes on RTÉ right up until the 2000s.

References

Other sources
 Dowling, Jack & Doolan, Lelia. Sit Down and Be Counted: The Cultural Evolution of a Television Station. Wellington Publishers (1969)
 Horgan, John. Broadcasting and Public Life: RTÉ News and Current Affairs 1926-1997. Four Courts Press (2004). 
 Bruce, Jim. Faithful Servant: A Memoir of Brian Cleeve. Lulu (2007). 

1960s Irish television series
1962 Irish television series debuts
1963 Irish television series endings
Irish television news shows
Jacob's Award winners
RTÉ News and Current Affairs
RTÉ original programming